Kentucky gained four seats after the 1810 Census.

Kentucky elected its members August 3, 1812.

See also 
 Kentucky's 8th congressional district special election, 1813
 United States House of Representatives elections, 1812 and 1813
 List of United States representatives from Kentucky

Notes 

1812
Kentucky
United States House of Representatives